The Wales national rugby league team represents Wales in international rugby league football matches. Currently the team is ranked 17th in the IRL World Rankings.  The team was run under the auspices of the Rugby Football League, but an independent body, Wales Rugby League, now runs the team from Cardiff. Six Welsh players have been entered into the Rugby League Hall Of Fame.

As with other Welsh national sporting teams, Wales strip has been primarily red. However, in the World Cup campaign in 2000 they wore a shirt featuring the Welsh flag, adding a touch of green and white. The team is known as "The Dragons" and so the team's logo on the shirt is a red dragon.

The team date back to 1907, making them the third oldest national side after England and New Zealand, and it was a touring New Zealand side that Wales first played against in 1908, winning 9–8 at Aberdare. Since then, Wales have regularly played England, since 1935 France, as well as welcomed the touring Australia and New Zealand teams, although they rarely toured themselves, not playing a match in the Southern Hemisphere until 1975. For 26 years Wales competed against their two biggest rivals, England and France, in the European Nations Cup, winning the trophy four times.

Wales has also competed in the World Cup on five occasions, the first time being in 1975. In 1995 and 2000 they had their most successful tournaments to date, making the Semi-Finals on both occasions before being beaten by England and Australia respectively. Wales failed to qualify for the 2008 World Cup, being the second highest ranked side not to do so, having lost to Scotland on points difference over two matches. They then qualified for the 2013 World Cup but failed to win a game, including losing 32–16 to low ranked Italy in their opening game at the Millennium Stadium in Cardiff.

In recent seasons, Wales has taken massive strides under former player Iestyn Harris who had coached Wales to back to back European Cup successes, which culminated in a Four Nations appearance in 2011. In 2014 former England and France coach John Kear became the new head coach after Iestyn Harris left the post to concentrate on his new job as head coach at Salford Red Devils.

History

Foundations

On 5 April 1904, England played an international match against the "Other Nationalities", a team of Welshmen and Scotsmen, in Wigan. Of the twelve players who played for the Other Nationalities team, as it was a 12-a-side game, ten of them were Welshmen coming from Northern English clubs. At the turn of the century many Welshmen made the switch from rugby union, wanting to be paid for playing, and although the numbers switching were constantly increasing, the Northern Union did not think that a Welsh side would be strong enough for England. After 80 minutes however, the Other Nationalities had beaten England 9–3. Nevertheless, this team carried on for another two years, playing England annually in 1905 and 1906, losing 26–11 and drawing 3–3 respectively.

The Kiwis In Aberdare

From 1905 to 1910 Rugby League as a sport enjoyed growth, not just in Wales and England, but also on the east coast of Australia and in northern New Zealand. When Albert Henry Baskerville's NZ All Golds with their guest Australian star Dally Messenger arrived in Britain for the inaugural tour by a southern hemisphere side, the first full international was against Wales on New Year's Day 1908. The Welsh rugby league team were contesting their first national fixture, and managed to beat the touring Kiwis 9–8 in Aberdare in front of 20,000 spectators. This was the first international match played under new "Northern Union" rules, which would later be rapidly changed again, but these rules were a small departure from traditional rugby union rules which had been used in previous international matches (minus the number of players, who were experimentally changed by the NU several times). The New Zealand team, or the "All Golds" as they were being called by the New Zealand newspapers, had never played rugby by these rules before but did have a week of preparation and training sessions leading up to the match. With this Welsh victory and large crowd, Wales played their second fixture in Tonypandy, and managed to win that match too recording a 35–18 win against what would soon become their main rival, the England Lions. At the end of 1908 Wales played their third and final fixture of the decade, playing England again, but this time in Broughton, Lancashire. This time they lost 31–7. However, in 1909 another victory was to occur for Welsh Rugby League, with a Welsh League XIII made up of players still playing in Wales beating a touring Australian side 14–13 in Merthyr.

Defeats against England
In the years before the outbreak of the war, Wales regularly played England. The two national teams played each other every year, including 1914. Due to Rugby League only extensively being played in the two countries in the whole of the Northern Hemisphere, touring Australia and New Zealand teams were the only chances to play someone different. Although the two matches against the English played in Wales were played in Ebbw Vale in Monmouthshire, the Welsh travelled around England for away matches, playing in Coventry, Oldham, Plymouth and St. Helens. Collectively those seven matches in Wales and England produced six defeats for the Welsh team, although there were signs of improvement, in the last match in St Helens the Dragons narrowly lost by just four points, the match ending 16–12. On the 7 October 1911 Wales played Australia for the first time. The match, held at Ebbw Vale again, drew 7,000 people to watch Wales go down 20–28. The match was significant though because throughout the next few decades Australia would play the Dragons in Wales whenever they toured Great Britain. During and after the First World War many sports suffered, and rugby league in Wales was no exception, the team didn't play a match again until 1921.

The Twenties

After a seven-year hiatus Wales once again played England and continued to do so annually throughout the 1920s, apart from in 1924. Because of the long hiatus a large proportion of players competing in the 1921 match were earning their first cap for the team. The first game at Leeds saw Wales lose 35–9 in front of 13,000. A further 13,000 saw the 1921–22 Kangaroo touring side play Wales in December 1921, this time in Pontypridd. Like the first time these nations played each other, Australia narrowly defeated the Welsh, the final score being 16–21. In 1922 Wales took part in the first international rugby league match to be played in London. England beat Wales 12–7 in Herne Hill but just 3,000 people turned up to watch, one of the lowest attendances to ever watch a Wales match. After four more matches against England in various Rugby League strongholds in Northern England, the Dragons once again played in Wales. Two matches were played in 1926 in Pontypridd, the same year that a Pontypridd domestic side joined the English leagues, although they disbanded a year later. The first match saw finished Wales 22–30 England with a record 23,000 in attendance. The second match saw Wales comfortably beat the touring New Zealand 34–8. Three more matches against England were played including one in November 1928 played in Cardiff. It was in the 1920s that Jim Sullivan, one of three Welsh players to be enrolled into the Rugby League Hall Of Fame, started rising through the ranks at Wigan. A career spanning 25 years saw him play many times for Wales picking up 26 caps, a record that was only beaten in 2010 by Ian Watson. He also represented Great Britain 25 times and Glamorgan and Monmouthshire 12 times.

The European Nations Cup
The 1930s were to herald a new era for the team as it emerged at times as one of the dominant sides in world rugby league. In 1930 and 1933 Wales played Australia at Wembley Stadium in London. On both occasions they failed to win, losing 26–10 and being thrashed 51–19. However at the time Australia were arguably considered the world's second best nation (behind England) and so particularly in the first game, Wales had done very well against the touring Kangaroos. Wales luck against England did not change either suffering three losses to the Lions in three games, in Huddersfield, Salford and Leeds. They were very unlucky in the latter however, with England winning 14 points to 13. Exactly 27 years after Wales played their first match, they played France for the first time in a new competition called the European Nations Cup, in which Wales, France and England would play two matches each. Wales and France kicked off the tournament on New Year's Day in front of 15,000 in Bordeaux. But the Dragons lost 18–11, and their match against England was just as bad losing 24–11 in Liverpool. The France versus England match finished a 15–15 draw so England won the inaugural competition on points difference. Wales finished bottom. The next European Nations Cup brought better fortunes to the Welsh and they kicked off the competition, which was staged across Winter 1935 and 1936, with a 41–7 thrashing against France. The team were cheered on by 25,000 people at Llanelli and three months later Wales did the unexpected and squeezed past England, winning 14–17 away at Hull. This was a huge result for Wales, having not beaten England since 1923, and they had won the cup for the first time. For the next two competitions Wales successfully defended the cup. A 3–2 win against the English in Pontypridd, coupled with a 9–3 victory in Paris saw Wales clinch the cup for the second time, and then in 1938 the Dragons beat England again by one point in Bradford before beating the French 18–2. This represents perhaps the highest point in Welsh rugby league history with great players such as Jim Sullivan, Gus Risman, Alan Edwards and Alec Givvons featuring. In 1935 Welsh rugby league would produce its first black international in George Bennett (some 48 years before Welsh rugby union would do so). In the 1938/1939 tournament, the last to be held for six years because of the Second World War, Wales beat their main rivals England before dramatically losing 16–10 in Bordeaux against Les Tricolores. Because of the French's victory against England, Wales finished second and the cup was taken across the channel.

During the 1978 Kangaroo tour Wales played Australia at St Helen's ground in Swansea, losing 8–3.

Timeline

 1 January 1908 – Wales play their first international match against New Zealand played at the Athletic Ground in Aberdare in front of 15,000 fans. Wales won 9–8.
 19 January 1909 – The Welsh League XIII defeat the touring Australians 14–13 at Penydarren Park in Merthyr Tydfil.
 1926 – Wales defeat the touring New Zealand 34–8 at Pontypridd. The Kiwis were awarded full caps for the match.
 18 January 1930 – Australia defeat Wales 26–10 in the first ever rugby league international played at London's Wembley Stadium. The non-test international attracted 20,000 fans.
 1936 – Wales win the 1935–36 European Rugby League Championship with a 17–14 win over England at Craven Park in Hull.
 1937 – Wales win their second consecutive European Championship.
 1938 – Wales win the European championship for the third consecutive season.
 24 November 1945 – 30,000 people attend a match against England at the St. Helen's Rugby Ground in Swansea. As of 2017 this remains the largest stand alone attendance for an international match in Wales.
 1947 Wales defeat England 10–8 at Central Park in Wigan.
 10 June 1975 – Clive Sullivan's try effectively won the World title for Australia, as Wales beat England 12–7 at Lang Park in Brisbane, thanks to Sullivan's match-clinching try after chasing a ball over the English line. The final three games in the tournament, however, all ended in losses and Wales finish third. 1975 was the first time Wales appeared at the Rugby League World Cup, all previous cups had seen the British isles represented by Great Britain.
 27 October 1991 – Papua New Guinea met Wales at Vetch Field, Swansea. Roared on by a fervent crowd of 11,422; Wales won by a record 68–0 margin, scoring thirteen tries. In that match dual-rugby international Jonathan Davies scored 24 points from two tries and 8 goals.

 December 1992 – Wales defeat France in Perpignan, their first win on French soil for 30 years.
 1995 – Wales win the European Championship, with a win over England (the first since 1968 and the biggest on Welsh soil). Mike Gregory is head coach for the 1995 World Cup. Wales make the semi-finals of the World Cup, only to lose to England 25–10 at Old Trafford in Manchester. The 1995 World Cup between Wales and Western Samoa in front of a capacity crowd of over 15,000 at Swansea was a pinnacle for Welsh Rugby League in the modern era. Following rugby union's decision to go professional, the flow of talent going north from the valleys dried up and Jonathan Davies returned to rugby union.
 5 June 1996 – Wales beat France in Carcassonne to bring home the European Championship for the first time in 57 years.
 1997 – Anger as the Rugby Football League announce that at the proposed 1998 World Cup (never played), Wales would not be included to allow the appearance of the New Zealand Māoris. Wales were once again to form part of Great Britain.
 19 June 1998 – Emerging England defeat a full Welsh side in Widnes.
 2000 – Wales again made the World Cup semi finals, losing to Australia 46–22 in a hard-fought battle at Huddersfield.
 November 2005 – Wales took second in the European Nations Cup, losing to France in the final at Carcassonne.
 9 November 2007 – Wales loses 50–26 to Lebanon, having led 16–10 at half-time, ending their chances to qualify for the 2008 Rugby League World Cup
 2009 – Wales win the European cup; defeating Scotland 28–16 in the final at the Brewery Field in Bridgend. Only 1,608 spectators turn up for the game.
 2010 – Wales win the European cup to qualify for the 2011 Four Nations against Australia, England and New Zealand.
 27 October 2012 – Wales are thrashed 80–12 by England at the Racecourse Ground, Wrexham as part of the Autumn Internationals series.
 2013 – Wales failed to win a game at the 2013 Rugby League World Cup held in England and Wales.
 October and November 2014 – Wales were beaten in all three games in the 2014 European Cup.
 16 October 2015 – Wales ended their spree of 12 consecutive defeats with an 18–12 victory against Scotland in the opening game of the 2015 European Cup. Their last victory before this result occurred on 22 October 2011 with a 30–6 win over Ireland. Wales would go on to win their remaining two matches of the campaign, becoming the only unbeaten team in the competition, and therefore become the champions of the 2015 European Cup competition, their 7th European Championship win in 32 championships held since 1935.

Kit

Current squad

Records
 As of 17 February 2020
 Bold- denotes player still active at club level

Most capped players

Top try scorers

Top points scorers

Competitive record

Overall
Below is table of the representative rugby matches played by the Wales national XIII at test level up until 24 October 2022.

World Cup

Four Nations

European Championship

Honours
Major:
World Cup: 
Semi-finalists (2): 1995, 2000

Regional:
European Championship: 
Winners (7):1935-36, 1936–37, 1938, 1995, 2009, 2010, 2015
Runners-up (9): 1938–39, 1946–47, 1952–53, 1975, 1977, 1978, 1996, 2005, 2018

Rankings

Coaches 

Source:

Notable players

Rugby League Hall Of Fame

The following Welsh players have been inducted into both the British Rugby League Hall of Fame and the international Rugby League Hall of Fame :

Billy Boston
Gus Risman
Jim Sullivan

Welsh Sports Hall Of Fame

The following Welsh players have been inducted into the Welsh Sports Hall of Fame:
1990 Billy Boston
1992 Jim Sullivan
1998 Lewis Jones
2000 Gus Risman, David Watkins
2003 Jonathan Davies, Willie Davies
2004 Trevor Foster
2009 Clive Sullivan

See also

 List of Wales national rugby league team players
 Rugby league in Wales
 Wales national rugby league team match results
 Wales A (Dragonhearts)

References

External links
 The Welsh Rugby League official website
 Google-Video
 HISTORY OF RUGBY IN OTHER COUNTRIES

 
National rugby league teams
Rugby league in Wales
Rugby League Four Nations